Runner Runner is a 2013 American crime thriller film.

Runner Runner may also refer to:

 Runner Runner (band), an American band
 Runner Runner (album), a 2011 album by the band
 Runner-runner, a poker term